Lasnedda was a town of ancient Lydia, inhabited during Roman times. Its name does not occur among ancient authors, but is inferred from epigraphic and other evidence.

Its site is tentatively located near Görece in Asiatic Turkey.

References

Populated places in ancient Lydia
Former populated places in Turkey
Roman towns and cities in Turkey
History of Manisa Province
Saruhanlı District